Charles A. "Rip" Engle (March 26, 1906 – March 7, 1983) was an American football player and coach of football and basketball.  He served as the head football coach at Brown University from 1944 to 1949 and at Pennsylvania State University from 1950 to 1965, compiling a career college football record of 132–68–8.  Engle was also the head basketball coach Western Maryland College–now known as McDaniel College–during the 1941–42 season at Brown from 1942 to 1946, tallying a career college basketball mark of 53–55.  He was inducted into the College Football Hall of Fame as a coach in 1973.

Early life and playing career
Engle was born in Elk Lick Township, Somerset County, Pennsylvania.  He played college football as an end at Western Maryland College, now McDaniel College.

Coaching career
Engle's coaching record from 1944 to 1965, including stints at Brown University and Penn State, was 132–68–8. He played football at Western Maryland College, reportedly in the first game he ever saw.

Under the leadership of Engle at Brown, Joe Paterno developed as a capable quarterback and a skillful leader. After graduating in 1950, Paterno joined Engle at Penn State as an assistant coach. Upon Engle's retirement in February 1966, Paterno was named coach of the Nittany Lions for the 1966 season, a position he would hold until 2011. Engle's best season at Penn State was in 1962 when the Lions went 9–2, were ranked ninth in the country, and played in the Gator Bowl. He was inducted into the College Football Hall of Fame in 1973.

Engle developed a game called Angleball as a way for his players to maintain physical fitness in the off-season.

Death
Engle died on March 7, 1983, at a nursing home in Bellefonte, Pennsylvania.

Head coaching record

College football

See also
 List of presidents of the American Football Coaches Association

References

External links
 
 

1906 births
1983 deaths
American football ends
Brown Bears football coaches
Brown Bears men's basketball coaches
McDaniel Green Terror men's basketball coaches
McDaniel Green Terror football coaches
McDaniel Green Terror football players
Penn State Nittany Lions football coaches
High school football coaches in Pennsylvania
College Football Hall of Fame inductees
People from Somerset County, Pennsylvania
Coaches of American football from Pennsylvania
Players of American football from Pennsylvania
Basketball coaches from Pennsylvania